Events in the year 2017 in Guyana.

Incumbents
President: David Granger
Prime Minister: Moses Nagamootoo

Events

Sports
14 to 30 July – Guyana participated at the 2017 World Aquatics Championships with 3 competitors.

4 to 13 August – Guyana participated at the 2017 World Championships in Athletics with 2 competitors (1 man and 1 woman) in 3 events.

16 to 21 October – Georgetown hosted the 2017 Indoor Pan American Cup, (an indoor hockey tournament). The women's tournament was won by the United States, while Trinidad and Tobago won the men's tournament.

Deaths

5 July – John Rodriguez, Guyanese-born Canadian politician (b. 1937).

29 October – Frank Holder, jazz singer and percussionist (b. 1925).

References

 
2010s in Guyana
Years of the 21st century in Guyana
Guyana
Guyana